Pier Domenico Della Valle (born 4 May 1970) is a Sammarinese former footballer who played as a midfielder and made 21 appearances for the San Marino national team.

Career
Della Valle made his international debut for San Marino on 16 October 1991 in a UEFA Euro 1992 qualifying match against Bulgaria, which finished as a 0–4 away loss. He went on to make 21 appearances, scoring 1 goal, before making his last appearance on 7 October 2000 in a 2002 FIFA World Cup qualification match against Scotland, which finished as a 0–2 home loss.

Career statistics

International

International goals

References

External links
 
 
 

1970 births
Living people
People from Faetano
Sammarinese footballers
San Marino international footballers
Sammarinese expatriate footballers
Sammarinese expatriate sportspeople in Italy
Expatriate footballers in Italy
Association football midfielders
S.C. Faetano players